The 2017 Washington wildfires were a series of wildfires that burned over the course of 2017, a year that set weather records for heat and aridity in both Western Washington and Eastern Washington.

Timeline of events
Fire season officially began on April 15. Training of state fire crews was conducted in May, as well as training of Washington National Guard in helitack insertion for fire crews.

On the morning of August 1, smoke from BC fires pushed into the Seattle area, rapidly making Mount Rainier invisible on a cloudless day. In early August, heavy smoke from British Columbia over Seattle earned the social media title "". Mid-month, several large fires in the state's Cascades Range were ignited by lightning.

On August 8, the city of Seattle recorded 52 straight days without rain, a new record. The first measurable rainfall at Seattle-Tacoma International Airport (Sea-Tac) was 0.02 inches in mid-August, setting a record 55 day dry streak.

On September 2, the Governor of Washington, Jay Inslee, declared a state of emergency across all Washington counties due to wildfires.

On September 5, ash from the Central Washington fires fell "like snow" on Seattle and as far west as Grays Harbor County which borders the Pacific Ocean. University of Washington meteorology professor Cliff Mass said the situation in Seattle with "a smoke cloud so dense one would think it is low stratus deck" was unprecedented in his 30 years of experience. The Air Quality Index reached "hazardous" in Spokane, the worst of six levels; it had reached hazardous the day before in Newport, Washington, the worst in the country.

On September 5, Cle Elum-Roslyn School District announced the start of the school year would be postponed, and on the 6th, all classes and events in Ellensburg School District were canceled until September 11, due to unhealthy indoor air quality.

The first significant rain wasn't until after mid September. Eastern Washington also had a very dry year with Spokane setting a new record of 80 days without measurable rain. A climate scientist at University of Idaho said that the extremes caused greater fire activity and were due to climate change, but not necessarily linked to human causes.

List of fires

Leavenworth Fire, May
Spartan Fire, June
Sutherland Canyon and Straight Hollow fires, near Quincy, June
Diamond Creek Fire in Pasayten Wilderness, started late July and spread to Canada near Manning Provincial Park on August 31
Noisy Creek Fire, in Colville National Forest, began July 15
Monument Hill Fire caused partial evacuation of Quincy in August
"Smokezilla": smoke from 2017 British Columbia wildfires affected Seattle in August
Norse Peak Fire began in August, caused closure of Chinook Pass highway
Jolly Mountain Fire began on August 11, evacuations began August 31
On September 5, the Eagle Creek Fire jumped the Columbia Gorge from Oregon into Skamania County.

Resources

An infrared thermography-capable RC-26 surveillance aircraft and support crew from Washington Air National Guard were deployed to Fairchild Air Force Base in Spokane on August 12 in support of firefighting.

On August 29, the Washington Military Department's Emergency Operation Center at Camp Murray was activated in response to the Jolly Mountain Fire.

On September 5, the U.S. Army said 200 Washington-based soldiers were to be trained and sent to the Umpqua North Complex fires in Oregon's Umpqua National Forest.

Further reading

References

External links

Northwest Interagency Coordination Center (NWCC) for Oregon and Washington
Wildfire resources, Washington Department of Natural Resources
Season timeline, Central Washington University  (Ellensburg)

Wildfires
 
2017
May 2017 events in the United States
June 2017 events in the United States
July 2017 events in the United States
August 2017 events in the United States
September 2017 events in the United States